The Order of the October Revolution (Orden Oktyabr'skoy Revolyutsii) was instituted on October 31, 1967, in time for the 50th anniversary of the October Revolution. It was conferred upon individuals or groups for services furthering communism or the state, or in enhancing the defenses of the Soviet Union, military and civil. It is the second-highest Soviet order, after the Order of Lenin.

The insignia of the Order consisted of a badge, which was a red star with golden rays between the arms; at the centre was a pentagon bearing the image of the cruiser Aurora participating in the October Revolution. Above this was a red flag bearing the words "October Revolution" in Russian. A Hammer and Sickle emblem was placed at the bottom. The badge was worn on the left chest with a red ribbon bearing five blue stripes at the centre.

The Aurora was itself awarded the Order, the only ship ever to have received the award. Military units and institutions receiving the award applied the order name to their title upon its reception.

External links
Order of the October Revolution at the Directory of the orders, medals and signs of the USSR. 
Order of the October Revolution Reference Page

October Revolution, Order of the
Awards established in 1967
Awards disestablished in 1991
1967 establishments in the Soviet Union
1991 disestablishments in the Soviet Union